Rasim Bulić (born 10 December 2000) is a German footballer who plays as a midfielder for Mainz 05 II.

Career 
Bulić started his youth career at SG Rosenhöhe before joining Kickers Offenbach.

Bulić signed with Regionalliga side 1. FC Saarbrücken ahead of the 2019–20 season. He made two appearances in his first season as Saarbrücken won promotion to the 3. Liga. He made six more league appearances in the 2020–21 season.

On 12 January 2022, Bulić moved to Mainz 05 II.

References 

2000 births
Living people
German footballers
Association football midfielders
1. FC Saarbrücken players
1. FSV Mainz 05 II players
Regionalliga players
3. Liga players
Footballers from Frankfurt